Ahmed Al-Bardiny (born April 4, 1990) is a Qatari cyclist, who last rode for the . He rode at the 2013 UCI World Time Trial Championships.

Major results
2013
 1st Stage 3 Sharjah Cycling Tour

References

1990 births
Living people
Qatari male cyclists
Cyclists at the 2010 Asian Games
Cyclists at the 2014 Asian Games
Asian Games competitors for Qatar